Josef Csaplár (born 29 October 1962) is a Czech football manager and former player. He was most recently the head coach of FC Fastav Zlín.

Playing career
Born in Ostrov nad Ohří, Csaplár began playing football at the age of 12 at Spartak Příbram.

1979 he moved to UD Příbram, where he jumped into the first team managed. In the 1985/86 season he played for Sklo Union Teplice, from 1986 to 1987, he completed his military service in VTJ Tábor and VTJ Karlovy Vary. Then he played again for Teplice before it in the 1988/89 season for the SK Rakovník auflief.

From 1992 to 1996 he ended his career at lower-league club TSV Waldkirchen.

Post-playing Career
While he still played Csaplár already worked as a youth coach at UD Příbram. In 1996, he took over the B-team.

In 1998, he was head coach of first division team, after only six points from twelve games in November 1998 dismissed. Then he worked as an assistant coach in Pribram.

In 2001, he and Ladislav Škorpil trainer at Slovan Liberec, the Trainer duo (Csaplár was only officially co-coach) won with the team the Czech championship.

In the 2003–04 winter break, he moved from Slovan Liberec coach on the chair from Slavia Prague, the team fell from the third to fourth place.

In April 2005 ended prematurely Slavia cooperation with Csaplár, as the team only on a disappointing fourth place was.

For the 2005/06 season Csaplár signed a two-year contract with Panionios Athens, but after only three months in office dismissed. At the end of 2005 he took over the Polish Erstligist Wisła Płock, with whom he discussed the 2006 Polish Cup won.

In 2008 Csaplár worked with Everton F.C. as a scout.

In September 2008 he became the manager of Czech first division side Viktoria Žižkov, replacing Stanislav Griga, but in November he was sacked after just 55 days in the job, with the club at the bottom of the league table.

In 2011, he was head coach of the Czech Republic U17 team, which qualified for the 2011 FIFA U-17 World Cup for the first time in its history.

In December 2014, after six years, Csaplár returned to Czech first division scene, when he was together with Jiří Kotrba appointed as a coach of Slovan Liberec. After only three games, in which the club lost three times with a total score of 2–8, were both coaches dismissed from their positions.

Besides coaching career Csaplár works as a television commentator and expert. He has popularized terms such as "Csaplár's trap", "festival of easy losses" or "heavy poor quality" in the Czech football community.

Honours

Managerial
Slovan Liberec
Czech First League:  2001–02

Wisła Płock
Polish Cup:  2005–06
Polish SuperCup:  2006

1.FK Příbram
Czech National Football League runner-up:  2017–18

References

External links
 Profile
 

1962 births
Living people
Czech people of Hungarian descent
People from Ostrov (Karlovy Vary District)
Czechoslovak footballers
Czech footballers
Association football midfielders
FK Teplice players
1. FK Příbram players
Czech expatriate footballers
Expatriate footballers in Germany
Czech expatriate sportspeople in Germany
Czechoslovak football managers
Czech football managers
1. FK Příbram managers
FC Slovan Liberec managers
SK Slavia Prague managers
Panionios F.C. managers
Wisła Płock managers
FK Viktoria Žižkov managers
FC Fastav Zlín managers
Czech First League managers
Czech expatriate football managers
Expatriate football managers in Greece
Czech expatriate sportspeople in Greece
Expatriate football managers in Poland
Czech expatriate sportspeople in Poland
Sportspeople from the Karlovy Vary Region